Radha Krishna Patra (24 November 1942—28 January 2015) is an Indian Judge and former Chief Justice of the Sikkim High Court.

Career
Patra was enrolled as an advocate in 1966 and started practice in the Orissa High Court on Civil, Criminal, Revenue, Constitutional and Taxation matters. He served as Standing Counsel in Orissa High Court since 1974. Patra worked there as a Government advocate. On 22 June 1992 he was appointed an Additional Judge of Orissa High Court. He was elevated to the post of Chief Justice of the Sikkim High Court on 9 July 2003 and retired on 23 November 2004. After the retirement Justice Patra was appointed the Chairperson of Odisha Human Rights Commission. He led the Commission of Enquiry for the multi crore chit fund scam in the state of Odisha.

References

1942 births
2015 deaths
Indian judges
Judges of the Orissa High Court
Chief Justices of the Sikkim High Court
20th-century Indian judges
21st-century Indian judges